Afeez Babatunde Nosiru (born 1 March 1998) is a Nigerian professional footballer who plays as a midfielder for Greek Super League club Panetolikos.

References

1998 births
Living people
Nigerian footballers
Nigeria international footballers
Nigerian expatriate sportspeople in Greece
Super League Greece players
Panetolikos F.C. players
Association football midfielders